Cocorico or Coco Rico or Coq au Rico may refer to:

Business
Coco Rico, a Puerto Rican soda drink
Cocoricò (nightclub), an Italian dance venue

Arts and entertainment
Cocoricó, a Brazilian TV program 
Cocorico (magazine), a French art magazine
Cocorico! Monsieur Poulet, a French-Nigerien film from 1977
Cocorico (comedy duo), a Japanese comedy act (ココリコ in Japanese)

Others
"Cocorico!" ("cock-a-doodle-doo!"), the French onomatopoeia for the rooster crow and as such is a French victory roar, the rooster being one of the French Republic’s emblems.
Rufous-vented chachalaca, national bird of Trinidad and Tobago, which is called “cocrico” in Trinidad and Tobago